Viinanen is a Finnish surname. Notable people with the surname include:

Iiro Viinanen (born 1944), Finnish politician
Mika Viinanen (born 1979), Finnish ice hockey player

References

Finnish-language surnames